Baker's Cove is a former hamlet in the Burgeo District of the Canadian province of Newfoundland and Labrador.

See also
List of ghost towns in Newfoundland and Labrador

Ghost towns in Newfoundland and Labrador